The 2010 Japanese motorcycle Grand Prix was the fourteenth round of the 2010 Grand Prix motorcycle racing season. It took place on the weekend of 1–3 October 2010 at the Twin Ring Motegi, located in Motegi, Japan. It was originally planned to take place on the weekend of April 23–25, but due to disrupted air travel caused by the 2010 eruption of Eyjafjallajökull it was postponed as it was difficult for team personnel and equipment to get there.

MotoGP classification

Moto2 classification

125 cc classification

Championship standings after the race (MotoGP)
Below are the standings for the top five riders and constructors after round fourteen has concluded.

Riders' Championship standings

Constructors' Championship standings

 Note: Only the top five positions are included for both sets of standings.

References

Japanese motorcycle Grand Prix
Japanese
Motorcycle Grand Prix
October 2010 sports events in Japan